The eagle rays are a group of cartilaginous fishes in the family Myliobatidae, consisting mostly of large species living in the open ocean rather than on the sea bottom.

Eagle rays feed on mollusks and crustaceans, crushing their shells with their flattened teeth. They are excellent swimmers and are able to breach the water up to several metres above the surface. Compared with other rays, they have long tails, and well-defined, rhomboidal bodies. They are ovoviviparous, giving birth to up to six young at a time.

Classification
Nelson's book Fishes of the World treats cownose rays, mantas, and devil rays as subfamilies in the Myliobatidae. However, most authors (including William Toby White) have preferred to leave the Rhinopteridae and Mobulidae outside of the Myliobatidae. White (2014) retained three genera (Aetobatus, Aetomylaeus, and Myliobatis) in the Myliobatidae, while a fourth (Pteromylaeus) was synoymized with Aetomylaeus. A 2016 paper placed Aetobatus in its own family, the Aetobatidae.

See also
 Stingray injury
 List of prehistoric cartilaginous fish genera

References

 
Taxa named by Charles Lucien Bonaparte
Extant Cenomanian first appearances